The 1998–99 Croatian First Football League was the eighth season of the Croatian top-level football league since its establishment.

Teams

Stadia and personnel

 1 On final match day of the season, played on 26 May 1999.
 2 Hrvatski Dragovoljac also used Stadion ŠRC Stanko Vlajnić-Dida in Slavonski Brod for their last eight home matches of the season.

Overview
It was contested by 12 teams, and Croatia Zagreb won the championship.
In the first stage upper six teams advance to Championship Group, bottom six to Relegation Group, with 50% of points taken to the next phase of the competition.

First stage

Rounds 1–22 results

Championship group

Rounds 23–32 results

Relegation group

Rounds 23–32 results

Top goalscorers

See also
1998–99 Croatian Second Football League
1998–99 Croatian Football Cup

External links
1998–99 in Croatian Football at Rec.Sport.Soccer Statistics Foundation

1998-99
Cro
Prva